The Hôpital Broca is a hospital of the Public Assistance - Paris Hospitals (AP-HP) located at 54-56 rue Pascal in the 13th arrondissement of Paris, specializing in clinical gerontology.

References

External links 
 

Hospitals in Paris